Valley railway station is a railway station that serves the village of Valley in Anglesey, Wales. It is the last station before the western terminus of the North Wales Coast Line at Holyhead. It also serves the nearby RAF base and Anglesey Airport.

History

Opened in 1849, there was a small goods yard for livestock and a siding for a nearby corn mill. Improvements during the 19th century included extension to the station buildings in 1870 and lengthening of the platforms in 1889. In 1962 transfer sidings were put in place near the station used for the dispatch by rail of spent fuel from the Wylfa nuclear power station and in 1989 sidings for turning steam locomotives were put in place.

The station was one of many small ones on the line closed in February 1966 as a result of the Beeching Axe, but it reopened to passenger trains in March 1982 after a sustained lobbying campaign by local residents. The westbound platform and waiting room were both demolished after the initial closure, but replacements were constructed prior to reopening; the main buildings on the eastbound side survived during the closure period (along with the platform they stood on) and remain intact to this day. The Grade II listed station signal box remains in use to supervise the B4545 level crossing here in addition to the aforementioned sidings.

On 6 July 2020 trains stopped calling at the station because of the short platform and the inability to maintain social distancing between passengers and the guard when opening the train door during the COVID-19 pandemic. On 11 August 2021 it was announced that the station would re-open. Local member of parliament Rhun ap Iorwerth criticised the length of the closure stating, "I still can't understand why there couldn't have been a way to open it safely before now, and I've made my frustration clear, but better late than never."

Facilities
The station is unstaffed (like all those between Bangor and Holyhead) and has no ticket machine, so all tickets have to be purchased prior to travel or on the train. Train running information is offered via a telephone, digital CIS displays and timetable posters. Step-free access is provided to both sides via the level crossing, although access for wheelchairs and mobility scooters is not easy from the down platform (2) due to the unpaved path.

Services 

There is a two-hourly weekday service in each direction from the station, with a few additional morning and evening departures. Most eastbound trains run to Wrexham General, Shrewsbury and Birmingham International, although a small number run to either Crewe or Cardiff.

The Sunday service is limited (six to Holyhead, seven towards Chester) and runs mainly to/from Crewe with one service to Wrexham and Cardiff.

Trains only stop here on request.

References

Further reading

External links 

Railway stations in Anglesey
DfT Category F2 stations
Former London and North Western Railway stations
Railway stations in Great Britain opened in 1849
Railway stations in Great Britain closed in 1966
Railway stations in Great Britain opened in 1982
Reopened railway stations in Great Britain
Railway stations served by Transport for Wales Rail
Beeching closures in Wales
Railway request stops in Great Britain
Valley, Anglesey
1849 establishments in Wales
Grade II listed railway stations in Wales
Grade II listed buildings in Anglesey